The Scrambler, Twist (in the UK), Twister, Cha Cha (in Australia), Sizzler, or Merry Mixer, is an amusement ride in which suspended riders spinning in cars experience centrifugal force, while spinning along two separate axes.  Riders are seated in small carriages clustered together and connected by beams at the top to a central point. The clustered vehicles are spun in one direction, while the ride as a whole spins in the opposite direction. There are a number of variations of the design.

Early history 
The first scrambler was invented by Richard Harris of Georgia and installed at Lakewood Fairgrounds in 1938. Two additional rides were built and sold in the following two years. In 1941, Harris was granted a U.S. patent for the design, which was then acquired or licensed by the Eli Bridge Company.

In late 1953, the Eli Bridge Company road-tested its Scrambler ride, and sold the first five by the end 1954. The original ride had a total of 12 cars distributed among its three arms with a capacity of 24 adults or 36 children. The entire ride rotated clockwise at 9–12 revolutions per minute.

The Eli Bridge Scrambler had one of its first major showings at the 1955 Florida State Fair, where it grossed $1,700 (at 25 cents a ride) in a single day and interested many additional buyers.

The rides first appeared in the UK in 1959, when they were manufactured by Edwin Hall under license from the Eli Bridge Company. Eli Bridge rides were first imported in 1979.

Variants

Grasscutter
A grasscutter scrambler has a basic frame shape and no platform and is driven by a lower arm assembly. This type of ride is extremely popular in the United States.

 Scrambler—These rides usually have a circular structure near the top of the ride. There are vertical bars that go around the top along with lights on them. For the most part, these rides are made by the Eli Bridge Company.
 Wisdom's Sizzler—This ride does not have a platform, but it still has thick arms at the top and bottom of each seating assembly. The top of the ride has 3 twisted metal structures. There are also lights all over the ride including the cars. These are popular in the US, but are no longer made by Wisdom.

Sizzler
A Sizzler is a ride which has thicker arms and a platform. It was when these type started being manufactured, the manufacturers concentrated on the ride aesthetics. Concerns have been raised about its safety, as the ride has been involved in at least six fatalities since 1997.

 Bennett & Pollards—These rides have a smaller circumference from the center of the ride to the seats. They are similar to Eli Bridge Scrambler rides because they also have cylinder structures on top of the ride.
 PWS Sizzler, Sonacase Twister, & Twist—These rides each have a platform, but they do not have objects near the top of the ride such as a cylinder structure. There are lights all around the center structure of the ride. Thus, these rides look similar.
 Wisdom's Family Sizzler—this ride has thick arms and a platform, along with a central structure with dazzling lights. It has wheels to guide the three pods along underneath, and is quite fast when compared to a Grasscutter-type ride. They are found mostly at indoor fun centers and are the only type of Sizzler being made by Wisdom.
 Wisdom's Super Sizzler—This ride has a platform, and it looks similar to the Sizzler. Another difference is that it goes backwards, and this ride also has a backdrop with some colorful art.

Gee Whizzer
The 'Gee Whizzer' derivative was constructed and commissioned by the operators King Carnival amusements of Tasmania, Australia during the 1950s. The project was carried out by rail engineers who utilised rail and tram parts which were common for the era. This machine is currently the largest and fastest of the variants utilising a unique fully suspended balanced single sweep arm design, driven from the top resulting in no lower arm assembly. The centre support core is fully independent and does not require a support deck, instead eight extended stabilisers are fitted to the core during assembly. Only one of these machines are known to be in existence.

Cyclone
A Cyclone, also known as a Lifting Twist, manufactured by ARM UK, has very much the same function and appearance as a normal Sizzler, except that the centre structure begins to lift with the cars once it reaches up to normal speed until it reaches above the fence level, where it remains for the duration of the ride. They are considerably fast when they reach full speed, although they normally slow down first so riders can brace for the full speed. After the full speed part is over, the centre structure begins to lower back to platform level as the ride slows down to a stop. Only two of these Cyclones currently exist in the world.

Installations

See also
 Troika (ride)

References

Amusement rides